James Cornish (born 1954) is a male retired British sport shooter.

Sport shooting career
He represented England and won a silver medal in the 50 metres rifle prone singles event and also competed in the pairs with Tony Lincoln, at the 1994 Commonwealth Games in Victoria, British Columbia, Canada.

References

1954 births
Living people
British male sport shooters
Commonwealth Games medallists in shooting
Commonwealth Games silver medallists for England
Shooters at the 1994 Commonwealth Games
Medallists at the 1994 Commonwealth Games